A castellan is the constable or official in charge of a castle and its territory.

Castellan may also refer to:

 Castellan (Doctor Who), the character in the Doctor Who TV serial
 Castellan, Pembrokeshire, a former parish in Wales

People with the surname
 Antoine-Laurent Castellan (1772–1838), French painter, architect, and engraver
 Carlos Castellan (born 1962), Argentinian tennis player
 Erin Castellan, American contemporary artist
 Jeanne-Anaïs Castellan (1819–1861), French soprano
 Julieta Castellán (born 1972), Argentinian field hockey player
 Osvaldo Castellan (1951–2008), Italian cyclist
 Pierre-Joseph de Castellan (fl. 1748–1785), French Navy officer

See also 
 Castile (historical region) whose inhabitants are Castilians
 Castellano (disambiguation), the native term for the people, culture, and language of Castile
 Castellana (disambiguation)
 Castellane, Taranto, Italy
 Castellania (disambiguation)
 Castellation, the defensive feature on a castle wall
 Castelen, a surname